A. fragilis may refer to:

 Acronicta fragilis, the fragile dagger moth, a moth species found from Newfoundland to Florida
 Actinodaphne fragilis, a plant species endemic to Malaysia
 Aglaia fragilis, a plant species endemic to Fiji
 Allosaurus fragilis, a large theropod dinosaur species that lived 155 to 145 million years ago during the late Jurassic period
 Anguis fragilis, the slowworm or blindworm, a limbless reptile species native to Eurasia 
 Apogon fragilis, a cardinalfish from the Indo-West Pacific
 Argonauta fragilis, a pelagic octopus species
 Ascobulla fragilis, a sea snail species
 Atalacmea fragilis, a sea snail species
 Atrina fragilis, the fan mussel, a large saltwater clam or marine bivalve mollusc species

See also
 Fragilis (disambiguation)